Sue Cook (born Susan Lorraine Thomas, 30 March 1949) is a British television presenter and author. She is best known for co-presenting (with Nick Ross) the BBC One factual crime show Crimewatch from 1984 until 1995.

Early life
Sue Cook (born Susan Lorraine Thomas, 30 March 1949) is a British television presenter and author. She is best known for co-presenting (with Nick Ross) the BBC One factual crime show Crimewatch from 1984 until 1995. Cook's mother, Kathleen Thomas was born in 1919 and still lives in her own home in Ickenham, Middlesex. Her father, William Thomas, was a senior executive with the Commission on Industrial Relations (later ACAS). She has two younger brothers and lived on Burnham Avenue in Ickenham. She attended Glebe Primary School, then the newly opened Vyners Grammar School, also in Ickenham on Warren Road. She gained ten  O-levels and three A-levels, and went on to the University of Leicester, graduating in 1971 with an honours degree in psychology.
She gained the Queen’s Guide Award in 1964.

Career
Sue Cook's broadcasting career began as a producer, presenter and DJ for London's Capital Radio before moving to the BBC where, over the next thirty years, she presented programmes for both radio and television—notably, You and Yours, Making History, Nationwide, BBC Breakfast, We're Going Places, Daytime Live, Children in Need, Out of Court. In 1984 Cook was the joint Presenter with Nick Ross on BBC's successful launch of Crimewatch staying for eleven years.

Other BBC TV presenting credits include Pebble Mill at One, BBC Breakfast, ‘’Daytime Live’’,  Omnibus at the Proms, Having a Baby, the documentary series Hampton Court Palace,  Great Ormond Street Hospital, Maternity Hospital, the 1994 Pilot for Out of This World, (the series presented by  Carol Vorderman, in 1996), and the Children's Royal Variety Performance. She was a regular guest on Call My Bluff, and a member of Holidays team of reporters. For Channel 4 she hosted The Chelsea Flower Show, the Hampton Court Flower Show and the popular afternoon series Collectors Lot. She also appeared briefly as herself in the BBC television drama serial Edge of Darkness (1985) and in The Life and Loves of a She-Devil (1986).

Cook is a recurring character in the comedy series I'm Alan Partridge, in which she is an unseen friend of Partridge's.

Recognition
The University of Leicester conferred an honorary D.Litt degree on Cook in 1997 in recognition of her contribution to British broadcasting.

Publications
Cook's two novels, On Dangerous Ground (2006) and Force of Nature (2009), were published by Hodder Headline. She devised and presents a supportive series for writers, The Write Lines, for BBC Oxford.

Film
Cook was the executive producer of Tracker (2010), a film which starred Ray Winstone and was directed by her husband, Ian Sharp, with whom she collaborated on the screenplay. It was released in the UK in April 2011. 

She is adapting her first novel, On Dangerous Ground, for the screen.

Charities
Cook is an Ambassador for the Prince's Trust, and a patron of the British Wireless for the Blind Fund, the Children's Liver Disease Foundation, the Rainbow Trust Children's Charity and Humanists UK.

References

External links 

The Write Lines website
Times Educational Supplement, April 1999

1949 births
Alumni of the University of Leicester
British reporters and correspondents
English television presenters
Living people
People from Ruislip